Gustavo García may refer to:

 Gustavo García (1980s footballer), Mexican footballer
 Gustavo Enrique García (born 1980), Mexican footballer
 Gustavo C. Garcia (1915–1964), American civil rights attorney
 Gustavo L. Garcia (1934–2018), American politician, mayor of Austin, Texas
 Gustavo Julian Garcia (1972–2016), Texas death row inmate
 Gustavo García (sport shooter) (born 1956), Colombian sports shooter
 Gustavo Garcia (footballer, born 2002), Brazilian footballer

See also
 Gustave García (1837–1925), Italian baritone opera singer and singing teacher